The following is a summary of the Grappa Musikkforlag albums discography. Grappa Musikkforlag is a Norwegian record label.

References

External links 
 

Discographies of Norwegian record labels